Desperate Lives is a 1982 American made-for-television drama film about drug use in a high school. The film has a very strong anti-drug message.

Plot summary

The Cameron family seems, on the surface, to be the perfect family, but things are not as they seem. Their two teenage children, Scott and Sandy, fall in with the wrong crowds at their high school and eventually become involved with drug experimentation. Sandy, after ingesting angel dust made by her boyfriend in the school's chemistry lab, jumps through a glass window of the school (purposely cutting her arms with the cut glass in the process) and is subsequently paralyzed from the fall.

A caring idealistic guidance counselor, Eileen Phillips, sees the problem that is going on in the school and, after other tragic incidents involving two other students (one of which involves Scott and his girlfriend smoking drugs and crashing their car off a cliff) and when no one else on the staff is willing to do anything about it, takes the steps to deal with and confront the problem. The aftermath of this tragedy makes Scott and Sandy's parents realize that even their "perfect" kids can be affected by drugs, especially after Scott has a violent reaction and goes into the hospital.

At a school assembly, Eileen storms in and confronts the students about the increasing drug use, sending a message to the crowd about the effects of what the drug problem is doing to the kids and the tragedies that resulted because of it.

Cast
 Diana Scarwid as Eileen Phillips
 Doug McKeon as Scott Cameron
 Helen Hunt as Sandy Cameron
 William Windom as Dr. Jarvis
 Art Hindle as Stan
 Tom Atkins as John Cameron
 Norman Alden as Coach
 Tricia Cast as Susan Garber
 Sam Bottoms as Ken Baynes
 Diane Ladd as Carol Cameron
 Grant Cramer as Steve
 Michele Greene as Julie Jordan
 Terry Alexander as Robert Walsh
 Dr. Joyce Brothers as Mrs. Watson
 Aggie Terry as  Cindy
 Katherine Kelly Lang as Mary
 Susan McClung as Sarah
 Clayton Rohner as Monte
 Jenny Parsons as Olivia 
 Mykel T. Williamson as Jack
 Jane Milmore as Jane
 Curt Ayers as Jesse
 Michele Laurita as Diana
 Glenn-Michael Jones as Al
 Joey Green as Howard
 Michael Cummings as Brad Davis
 Viola Kates Stimpson as Grandmother

Production notes
 The theme song to "Desperate Lives" was written and sung by Rick Springfield.
 Some of the movie was filmed at William S. Hart High School in Newhall, Santa Clarita, California.

Home media
Desperate Lives was released on DVD on April 21, 2010.

Keyboard Cat meme
A Keyboard Cat video featuring clips from the film was uploaded to YouTube in 2009. However, it was later taken down for copyright reasons, because the video also contained the music video for "You Make My Dreams" by Hall & Oates.

References

External links

 Yahoo! profile

1982 television films
1982 films
1980s teen drama films
American teen drama films
American high school films
Films about drugs
1980s English-language films
CBS network films
Films scored by Bruce Broughton
American drama television films
Films directed by Robert Michael Lewis
1980s American films